The Puerto Rican Volunteers Corps (Instituto de Voluntarios de Puerto Rico in Spanish) was a militia composed of private citizens, principally instituted for the defense of Puerto Rico's periphery from pirate incursions and foreign invasion. In principle, the volunteers were characterized by their unwavering loyalty to the Spanish Crown and Empire, and as such were subject to compulsory membership in the Partido Incondicionalmente Español (The Spanish Unconditional Party). However, upon its creation in 1812 the Partido Incondicional was exclusive to all but peninsular-born Spaniards (peninsulares), and it was only towards the second half of the century that its rolls were opened to insular-born subjects of European descent (criollos).

Spanish–American War of 1898 
The Volunteer Corps did not fight as a group during the Spanish–American War of 1898, nor did the majority of its approx. 8,000 members assist the regular Spanish Army in its pro forma defense of the island. The Corps's conduct during the war was not due to rank rebellion but rather to recalcitrance: a low esprit de corps followed the Governor General of Puerto Rico's order to have all Volunteers integrated into the Regular Army without regard to any official rank or distinction they might have held in the Corps. Volunteers, by then consisting largely of the island's mercantile and hacendado elite (e.g., Manuel Egozcue Cintrón, Rafael Janer y Soler, Francisco J. Marxuach, Pompeyo Oliu y Marxuach, Narciso Vall-Llovera Feliu), recoiled at the perceived "injustice" and "indignity" of having to fight alongside men recruited from the lowest rungs of Spanish colonial society. Other—though perhaps less quantifiable—factors contributing to Volunteer inaction were the signal winds of change sweeping over the remnants of Spain's once vast imperial possessions; the Cortes's belated attempts at establishing an autonomist insular government in 1897; Spain's bloody and ineffectual efforts at ending the Ten Years' War; and the U.S.'s undisguised expansionist aims, combined with the contagion of assimilationist and insurrectionist groups operating from within the island and outwards from the U.S.

Additionally, by the time of the US invasion of the island on July 25, 1898, the Voluntarios and indeed most everyone else in Puerto Rico, was well aware that Spain's land and naval forces had surrendered in Cuba and that Admiral Montijo's fleet in the Philippines had been virtually destroyed. Moreover, it was quite evident that Spain's regular army was not putting up much of a fight for Puerto Rico. Accordingly, the Voluntarios (with few exceptions) were not willing to risk injury or death in a war that was in effect, lost. New York's Seventh Volunteer Infantry Regiment also refused to enter the fray. Reportedly, they did not want to serve under regular army officers, particularly those who had graduated from West Point.

Battalions 
In 1898 they were up by a Commanding Officer and staff consists of a commander, three captains, two first lieutenants, four deputies, a doctor and a pharmacist. His active force was formed by 14 infantry battalions and the company on the island of Vieques.

List of battalions in  1897:

See also 

 History of Puerto Rico

References

External links 
 The Puerto Rican Volunteers Corp 
 El Instituto de Voluntarios 
 Trask, David. The War with Spain in 1898. Pg. 155
 Crónica de la Guerra Hispano-americana en Puerto Rico 
 La escolta del general Macias 

Military in Puerto Rico
Military history of Puerto Rico
1864 establishments in Puerto Rico